This is a list of awards and nominations received by American actor, director, screenwriter, producer and musician Paul Dano.

Major associations

BAFTA Awards

Golden Globe Awards

Primetime Emmy Awards

Screen Actors Guild Awards

Other awards and nominations

Alliance of Women Film Journalists

Black Reel Awards

Boston Online Film Critics Association

Boston Society of Film Critics

Critics' Choice Movie Awards

Critics' Choice Television Awards

Dallas-Fort Worth Film Critics Association

Detroit Film Critics Society

Directors' Week Awards

Florida Film Critics Circle

Empire Awards

Gotham Awards

Grand Jury Awards

Independent Spirit Awards

International Online Cinema Awards

Kermode Award

London Film Critics' Circle

National Board of Review

New York Film Critics Online

North Carolina Film Critics Association

San Diego Film Critics Society

San Francisco Film Critics Circle

Satellite Awards

Saturn Awards

Stockholm International Film Festival

St. Louis Film Critics Association

Village Voice Film Poll Awards

Washington D.C. Area Film Critics Association

Notes

References

External links
 

Dano, Paul